FC Luys-Ararat, is a defunct Armenian football club from the capital Yerevan. The club was dissolved in 1994 and is currently inactive from professional football.

References

Defunct football clubs in Armenia
1994 disestablishments in Armenia